Education in Ontario comprises public and private primary and secondary schools and post-secondary institutions. Publicly funded elementary and secondary schools are administered by the Ontario Ministry of Education, while colleges and universities are administered by the Ontario Ministry of Training, Colleges and Universities. The current respective Ministers for each are Stephen Lecce and Ross Romano. The province's public education system is primarily funded by the Government of Ontario, with education in Canada falling almost entirely under provincial jurisdiction. There is no federal government department or agency involved in the formation or analysis of policy regarding education for most Canadians. Schools for Indigenous people in Canada with Indian status are the only schools that are funded federally, and although the schools receive more money per individual student than certain provinces, the amount also includes the operation and maintenance of school facilities, instructional services, students supports and staff.  Most provincial allocations per students do not include the maintenance and operation of buildings, as most provincial governments offer additional grants. 

Several publicly funded school systems provide elementary and secondary schooling to Canadian residents of the province from Junior Kindergarten to Grade 12. The school systems operate as English or French first language school boards, and as secular or separate school boards. The overlapping publicly funded school systems is organized into a number of school boards: 31 English secular, 29 English Roman Catholics, eight French Catholic, four French secular, and one Protestant separate school board. French-language school boards are guaranteed under Section 23 of the Canadian Charter of Rights and Freedoms, whereas minority Catholic and Protestant minorities in Ontario are entitled to their own school system under the Constitution Act, 1867. 

Post-secondary education in Ontario consists of 20 public universities, 24 public colleges and over 400 registered private career colleges.

History

Timeline 
Upper Canada's Grammar School Act of 1807 provided the first public funds for schools in what would become Ontario. 8 schools were opened.

 1804: St. Johns Common School in St. Johns was one of Ontario's first schools.
 1816: The Act of 1816 authorized local trustees to decide on hiring criteria for teachers.
 1823: A General Board of Education was established.
 1824: The Legislature supported "moral and religious instruction of the more indigent and remote settlements" by granting the Board of Education a budget to create Sunday schools.
 1824: The right to decide hiring criteria for teachers was transferred from trustees to the district Board.
 1834: The Mohawk Institute Residential School, the oldest continuously operated residential school in Canada, opens on Six Nations of the Grand River near Brantford
 1841: With the union of Upper and Lower Canada into the Province of Canada, the position of General Superintendent of Education was created.
 1843: With the realization that Canada West (formerly Upper Canada) and Canada East (formerly Lower Canada) had vastly different educational needs, the Act of 1841 was repealed. The Act of 1843 created the position of Chief Superintendent of Education for Canada West (which would become the Province of Ontario in 1867). Egerton Ryerson is Chief Superintendent from 1844 until his retirement in 1876.
 1847: Chief Superintendent Egerton Ryerson returns from a tour of European education systems and submits his "Report on a System of Public Elementary Instruction in Upper Canada". On the religious issue, he writes that "religious differences and divisions should rather be healed than inflamed".
 1847: Chief Superintendent Ryerson nominated School Section no. 2 in Thorold Township and School Section no. 4 in Stamford Township as the first non-rate paying schools in Upper Canada under the advice of District School Superintendent Dexter D’Everado.
 1850: The Common School Act updates 1847 legislation creating school boards across Canada West. It requires;  that municipalities meet the funding needs stated by their local school board and allows for schools to be paid for through provincial and municipal funds alone, allowing individual boards to eliminate school fees but not making this compulsory. The Act also allows for the creation of separate schools leading to provincially funded Catholic schools and to racially segregated schools.
 1871: The School Act makes elementary education compulsory and free up to age 12. The Act also created two streams of secondary education: high schools, the lower stream, and collegiate institutes, the higher stream. Extra funding was provided for collegiate institutes "with a daily average attendance of sixty boys studying Latin and Greek under a minimum of four masters".
 1876: The first Minister of Education was appointed, after Ryerson retired after 22 years as Chief Superintendent of Education.
 1891: The compulsory school-leaving age is raised to 14.
 1921: The compulsory school-leaving age is raised to 16 in urban areas with exemptions for students needed at home or already in the workplace.
 1954: 16 becomes the compulsory school-leaving age for all students, with work exemptions.
 1968: Release of the Hall-Dennis Report, officially titled Living and Learning.
 1970: Exemptions for work are removed from school legislation. All students must attend school until age 16.
 1984: Grade 13 is replaced by Ontario Academic Credit (OAC).
 1997: Education funding moves to the provincial level.
 2003: Secondary education becomes a four-year program, with the phasing out of Ontario Academic Credit.
 2013: Release of the Fullan Report, officially titled Great to Excellent.

Racially segregated schools 
An amendment to the 1850 Common School Act allowed for the creation of racially segregated schools. This was because the Common School Act included the Separate School Clause that allowed for the separation between different religions and races. At first, this sounded like a practical idea where each school could focus on teaching their faith or culture. However, it was taken advantage of and quickly became problematic as school trustees supported racial segregation towards non-White students. Racial segregation looked different depending on where it took place in Canada. Many of these schools were located in southwestern Ontario where Black individuals and families settled looking for freedom. Some schools in Ontario had separate school buildings, while others attended the same school but at different times. Those schools that were for Black students were characterized by markedly poorer conditions and little concern was shown for their education.  Scholars identify this as a suppressed history because it contradicts narratives of Ontario and Canada as places of justice and equality. However, this history includes a legacy of slavery in Canada that lasted for over 200 years as well as acts of terror perpetuated by white Ontarians such as burning the barns of Black families to the ground. The last racially segregated school in Ontario did not close until 1965  and in Nova Scotia until 1983, meaning that racially segregated schools existed for over one hundred years. Although Ontario and Nova Scotia were the two provinces to enact laws regarding racial segregation, many other provinces had racial segregation practices.

Residential schools in Ontario 
Residential schools in Ontario were part of the larger Canadian Indian residential school system which spanned the country. The Mohawk Institute Residential School in Brantford, Ontario was the oldest continually-operating residential school in Canada. Other residential schools also existed across the province. Egerton Ryerson was a key architect of the residential school system in Ontario. Residential schools were federally administered, meaning that the provincial government was not required to meet treaty obligations to Ontario First Nations for education. This saved the provincial government funds and was key to funding education in the province. Reserve schools continue to be funded by the federal government today under a different funding model than provincially funded schools. The curriculum in Ontario now includes the culture of Indigenous people, and the topic of maltreatment of Indigenous people in residential schools.

Legislation
Education in Ontario is governed by the Education Act. Provincial, federal and international human rights codes and charters also have stipulations on children's learning experiences.

Ontario Human Rights Code
The Ontario Human Rights Code states:
It is public policy in Ontario to recognize the dignity and worth of every person and to provide for equal rights and opportunities without discrimination that is contrary to law, and having as its aim the creation of a climate of understanding and mutual respect for the dignity and worth of each person so that each person feels a part of the community and able to contribute fully to the development and well-being of the community and the Province.

Teaching human rights
Ontario schools must educate students about human rights and develop young people's understanding of what they are, how they were developed and threats that challenge them. In 2009, the Ministry of Education implemented the Equity and Inclusive Education Strategy across the province that included making human rights education part of the primary and secondary curriculum. To assist educators, the Ministry worked with Ontario's Human Rights Commission and developed a guide with lessons, activities and case studies specifically designed to increase students' knowledge of human rights and to prompt discussion on such topics as discrimination, harassment and equality.

Structure and funding

Types of school boards
Ontario operates four publicly funded school systems: An English-language public school system, a French-language public school system, an English- language separate school system and a French-language separate school system. The public school system was originally Protestant but is now secular. The Separate School system is Roman Catholic (open to students of all faiths at secondary level, they have the option of refusing non-Catholics at the elementary level) with the exception of the Penetanguishene Protestant Separate School Board, which runs a single Protestant school in Penetanguishene.

School Board Funding Projections (excluding capital programs) estimates more than CAD$ 20 billion will be put toward the province's 73 school board districts in the 2012–2013 school-year.

See List of Ontario school boards

Levels in education

Preschool daycare is usually for children under 4 years of age. Next comes Junior Kindergarten/J.K (for children who turn 4 before December 31) and Senior Kindergarten/S.K (for children who turn 5 before December 31).

Ministry of Education documents divide grades into two categories: Elementary (Grades 1–8) and Secondary (Grades 9–12). Local variances exist in the division of grades (e.g. middle school).

While children must begin school if they are 6 years old on the first day of the school year, the cutoff is 31 Dec: A 5-year-old may start Grade 1 if they will turn 6 by December 31.  Children typically start a grade if they will be the following age by December 31:

There is no legal age or time constraint against attending secondary school longer than 4 years, although a limit on course credit exists. Victory lappers make up an average of 4% of all students enrolled in Ontario secondary schools each year.

Multi-age settings

Split-grade classes are common.

A pilot project groups match students by ability rather than age.

Montessori schools group students in 3-year age groups. Democratic schools have complete age-mixing. Homeschooling families and unschoolers decide for themselves about age-mixing.

Roots of Empathy brings a baby into an elementary school classroom, regularly over the course of a year, to help students develop social/emotional competence and empathy.

Curriculum-based schools

Almost all Ontario public schools, and most private schools, follow the Ontario Curriculum. It has specific requirements about knowledge and behaviours to be learned, while allowing flexibility in how the curriculum is delivered.

The secondary school curriculum offers three streams (or tracks): the Grades 9 and 10 curricula have the academic, applied and essentials streams. The academic courses are to prepare students for university-bound courses; the applied courses are to prepare students for college-bound courses; and the essentials courses are mainly for students, but not exclusively, with learning exceptionalities (e.g., learning disabilities, intellectually delayed, etc.). Recently, there have been parents and educational advocates pushing for de-streaming Grades 9 and 10, so students have more time to choose which pathway they would like to take.

Then the Grades 11 and 12 curricula have university-bound, college-bound and workplace-bound courses. All of the courses are to develop students' higher-order thinking skills, and every secondary school course must have a focus on skills-based learning no matter the stream; however, academic/university-bound courses tend to have a strong focus on abstract thinking and knowledge-based learning, and usually pushes students to become more independent in their learning compared with college- and workplace-bound courses. Once a student is taking a Grade 12 university-bound course, then the student is expected to be academically and intellectually challenged in order for them to build their knowledge and skills for a university post-secondary education. Even though college-bound courses are academically rigorous, there is more of a focus on skills-based learning and making the content of the course practical for everyday life. Workplace-bound courses are even more practical. Each stream has different learning expectations, so marks in each stream are not equal to one another. For example, an 85% average student in Grade 12 College English would not be considered for a university program if that student has not taken the Grade 12 University English credit.

Alternative schools

Within the public boards, alternative schools have begun to emerge. In 2009 the Africentric School opened in Toronto and in 2011 the DSBN Academy opened its doors. The Africentric school was established in part to address the 40% dropout rate of black students in the Toronto District School Board. the DSBN Academy is a new school aimed at providing additional supports for students who may lack access or the resources to attend post secondary education. These alternative schools are based on social contexts that the individual school boards deem necessary for their constituents and are funded within the publicly funded school systems.

In addition, alternative schools in Ontario have also come to be for religious contexts as in the case of Eden High School in St. Catharines. "Eden is a publicly funded secondary school that operates as an alternative secondary school within the District School Board of Niagara. The school offers the prescribed Ontario Ministry of Education's Secondary School program delivered in the context of a community where the educational objectives of the Ministry of Education and those of Eden's own Spiritual Life Department are respected and regarded as complementary in the training of students."

Private schools

Ontario private schools must do the following:

 Offer the Ontario curriculum or a program not of lesser educational value than the Ontario curriculum
 Meet provincial standards for such things as record keeping and facilities
 Submit annually an intention to operate a private school

A private institution is considered a school if "instruction is provided at any time between the hours of 9 a.m. and 4 p.m. on any school day for five or more pupils who are of or over compulsory school age in any of the subjects of the elementary or secondary school courses of study."

Private schools that meet provincial standards may offer the Ontario Secondary School Diploma.

There are approximately 700 private schools in Ontario, most represented by associations uniting schools of a common goal, view, or philosophy. Instructors are not required to be members of the Ontario College of Teachers, though many often are. More importantly, instructors are commissioned if their credentials satisfy the requirements outlined by their respective private school. As there are several types of private schools from elementary to the secondary school level, experience and training will differ for each.

Funding
In 2012–2013, the total expenditure for both public and private primary and secondary education in Ontario was $26,975,997,000.

Funding formula

The provincial government allocates funds to school boards based on factors including:

 number of students and schools
 preponderance of special education students
 rate of students with English or French as a second language
 percentage of Aboriginal students
 geographical features, such as having small schools or schools far apart

Controversies

Catholic public school funding

This issue received media attention during the controversy surrounding gay-straight alliances, especially after Halton Catholic District School Board's Alice Anne Lemay compared gay-straight alliance groups to those of the Nazis in an effort to explain her board's decision to ban gay-straight alliances in their schools. The ban on gay-straight alliances was repealed with board members voting 6–2 on the issue.

The UN has cited Ontario for discrimination against non-Catholics, as UNESCO states that religion not be affiliated with any political powers. They are suggesting that Ontario either fund no faith-based schools, or all of them. While Ontario's government maintains that its hands are tied in the matter (as the Constitution protects funding for the Catholic faith), many critics use the examples of Manitoba, Quebec, and Newfoundland (as provinces which have successfully navigated this obstacle) to counter their argument.

A CBC poll suggested that 58.2% of Ontarians want a single publicly funded school system.

About half of Ontario's government-funded District School Boards are Catholic (37 out of 72).

Contrary to the belief that Catholic schools are funded exclusively, the Canadian Constitution of 1867 gives the provinces the responsibility of education. Because schools were religiously based at the time, it includes protections for the minority religion whether it be Catholic or Protestant. Over time the majority Protestant boards have become secular as they had not had protections of minority status. This has not always been true though as there is one Protestant school board and Protestant school left in Ontario, the Burkevale Protestant Separate School in the Penetanguishene Protestant Separate School Board.

Organizations supporting education

There are many organizations in Ontario supporting education.

People for Education provides "research, resources and connections for everyone who cares about public education". Executive Director Annie Kidder believes that "Our public schools belong to all of us. They could and should be thriving hubs of every community – hubs of learning, of support for families and of neighbourhood activity."

The Society for Quality Education wants every child to succeed. The problem is that "most public schools are not using the most effective teaching methods and materials available. And, as a result, the students are not learning nearly as much as they could."

Student surveys

The Ontario Student Parent & Educator Survey is an annual survey regulated by the Ontario Student Trustees Association.

The Ministry of Education does a School Climate Survey of students at least every two years, to understand and prevent bullying, and to support a positive school climate.

See also
 Adler v. Ontario – On the constitutionality of funding religious schools
 ChangeTheWorld: Ontario Youth Volunteer Challenge – Government program promoting volunteerism
 Contact North – Government distance education program
 Education in Canada
 Education in Toronto
 Education Quality and Accountability Office
 Higher education in Ontario
 International Student Exchange, Ontario
 List of school districts in Ontario
 List of high schools in Ontario
 Ministry of Training, Colleges and Universities (Ontario)
 Ontario rubric
 Ontario Scholar
 Ontario Secondary School Literacy Test
 Ontario Secondary School Teachers' Federation
 Ontario Teachers' Federation
 Values, Influence, and Peers – A government program for Grade 6's

Sources

References

External links